Kojo Nana Obiri-Yeboah is a prominent Pentecostal pastor from Ghana who is active primarily in Uganda. He is the son of evangelical pastor John Obiri-Yeboah who was a well-known preacher in Uganda in the 1970s and 80s. His father was known for performing apparent miracles in his services.

Education
Kojo Nana Obiri-Yeboah attended Joseph Strechen Junior School and Aquinas Secondary School in Ghana. He continued his education in England, at Dulwich College and later Christ College in Blackheath, London. 
After a time helping out at his family's pineapple farm in Ghana, he returned to England to pursue a Diploma in Agriculture at Vauxhall College.

Back in Ghana, he managed the family farm and a travel business. There, he felt called to serve God. He later enrolled at Bulham College in London and Pembetchy Bible College in Denmark for Bible studies.  Preaching in Ghana and England, he established "We Are One Ministry".

Electric toy controversy
In July 2007, Yeboah came under international scrutiny after Ugandan police confiscated a small electric shock toy in his possession. The police asserted that devices of that sort were likely used by Obiri-Yeboah to give small electric shocks to people in services, making the people think that they had felt the intervention of the divine. The events with Obiri-Yeboah prompted the police to engage in wider investigation of pastors claiming to produce miracles in Uganda, with the support of other pastors such as the crusading Solomon Male.

Yeboah claims that the event was an unsuccessful attempt to frame him.

References

Nana has four children; three children and one son who resides in Ghana.

Pentecostal pastors
Ugandan clergy
Ugandan Pentecostals
Year of birth missing (living people)
Living people